As of the 2020 United States census, there were 7,637,387 people in the Dallas-Fort Worth metroplex.  The racial makeup of the MSA was 50.2% White, 15.4% African American, 0.6% Native American, 5.9% Asian, 0.1% Pacific Islander, 10.0% from other races, and 2.4% from two or more races. Hispanic or Latino of any race were 27.5% of the population.

The median income for a household in the MSA was $48,062, and the median income for a family was $55,263. Males had a median income of $39,581 versus $27,446 for females. The per capita income for the MSA was $21,839.

Ethnic groups

Non-Hispanic Whites

From 2000 to 2014 the absolute number of non-Hispanic white children in the DFW area increased by 140,000 from 2000 to 2014, although their relative percentage of the overall number of children in the DFW area declined. In that period the population of non-Hispanic white children largely shifted to Collin, Denton, and Rockwall counties away from Dallas County. From 1997 to 2015, in the first three counties, the number of non-Hispanic white K-12 students increased by 40,000, 20,000, and 6,000, respectively, while the number of non-Hispanic white students in Dallas County public school districts dropped from 138,760 in 1997 to 61,538 in the 2014–2015 school year; during the latter period the charter schools in the county had 5,000 non-Hispanic white students.

Middle Easterners

Arabs
There are approximately 275,000 Arab-Americans around Dallas County, with many of them coming from countries such as Egypt, Iraq, Syria, Lebanon, Palestine, Jordan, Morocco, Algeria, Tunisia, Yemen, etc.
The Roman Catholic Diocese of Dallas maintains a Lebanese Maronite Christian mission at Our Lady of Lebanon in Lewisville, established in 1990; as well as the St. Basil the Great Byzantine Catholic Church in Irving, established in 1983.

, the number of people of Egyptian heritage was about 5,000 to 10,000 in the DFW area.

Iranians
According to the 2000 Census, the Dallas-Fort Worth metroplex has about 5,000 Iranians. The city’s Iranian community was large and influential enough to host US Secretary of State Mike Pompeo for a private visit in April 2019. Most Iranians in the DFW area reside in the Plano-Frisco-Allen-McKinney areas north of Dallas although there are several near Arlington.

Kurds
There are roughly around 8,000 Kurds in the Dallas-Fort Worth metroplex, with many of them residing around the northern suburbs, especially around Plano. There is also a sizeable Kurdish community around Arlington. Most of them came as refugees from Iraq although there are also Iranian, Syrian and Turkish Kurds in the metroplex.

Hispanics and Latinos

Mexicans

Dallas–Fort Worth has one of the largest Mexican-American communities in the United States. In 2002, it was reported that Mexican-Americans make up 80% of Hispanic and Latinos in Dallas-Fort Worth. There are many Mexican restaurants, taco stands, grocery stores, etc in Dallas-Fort Worth and there is also a pizza chain called Pizza Patron that is very popular amongst Mexican-Americans. There are concentrations of Mexican-Americans in Oak Cliff, West Dallas and Arlington. As of the 2000 U.S. Census, 63% of the ethnic Mexicans in Dallas County resided in the Dallas city limits.

Salvadorans
As of 2009, Salvadoran Americans are the second largest Hispanic and Latino ethnic group in DFW. They often settle in the same areas occupied by Mexican-Americans. In 2000, of the Salvadorans in Dallas County, 47% are in the City of Dallas. That year, 3.6% of the foreign-born in Dallas were from El Salvador. There is a small Salvadoran settlement in East Dallas. As of 2009, in Irving the Salvadoran-origin people are 11.8% of those born outside of the United States; this percentage is larger than the average percentage of Salvadorans in Dallas–Fort Worth area cities. There are also Salvadoran populations in Farmers Branch and Garland.

In the 1990s the number of people of Salvadoran origins increased by 172%. As of 2009, many Salvadorans work legally in the U.S. due to their "Temporary Protected Status".

The Consulate of El Salvador is in central Dallas.

Blacks

African-Americans

The Dallas–Fort Worth metroplex gained approximately 233,000 new African-Americans between 2000 and 2010.  Second only behind Atlanta, Georgia during that time span.

In northern DFW suburbs, the black population rate has grown 178 percent since the 1990s. The strongest growth is in the southern suburbs, for example Cedar Hill was approximately 51.9 percent black in 2010, after a gain of more than 12,500 new black residents since the last decade. The southern suburbs (DeSoto, Duncanville, Lancaster, Cedar Hill) have been noted as the core of the African-American middle class and upper middle class community in the metroplex.  Historically, the black community was strongly concentrated in the inner-city of Dallas and Fort Worth but that has slowly changed since the 1980s. In addition to the New Great Migration, many African Americans are now recently moving to Dallas and Fort Worth for affordable cost of living and job opportunities.

Nigerians

As of 2000, of the recent Nigerian immigrant population in DFW, 61% live in Dallas County, and of the total number in Dallas County 49% live within the Dallas city limits. DFW has one of the largest Nigerian-American populations in the country.

Nigerians have a strong presence among top performers at the local universities in the Dallas–Fort Worth-Arlington area.

The main area of Nigerian settlement in Dallas, also occupied by African-Americans, includes a market frequented by Nigerians, a Nigerian-centered restaurant, and many rental units. It is in proximity to U.S. Highway 75.

Ethiopians
As of 2012 there are about 35,000 Ethiopians in the DFW area. Every year Ethiopian Day is held in Plano; the Mutual Assistance Association for Ethiopian Community organizes this festival. As of 2012 there were several Ethiopian restaurants in Dallas.

Asians
The Greater Dallas Asian American Chamber serves the DFW Asian community.

The Asian American Heritage Festival is held every year.

Chinese

According to the 2000 U.S. Census, 5,762 ethnic Chinese lived in Dallas County.

Plano, along with Houston, has one of the state's two major settlements of Chinese Americans. As of 2011, 5% Plano's population is ethnic Chinese. As of the 2000 U.S. Census, of the foreign-born residents of Plano, 17% originated from China. Richardson also has a Chinese immigrant community. In 2010 over 15% of the people in Richardson are ethnic Chinese. The D-FW China Town is located in Richardson.

Filipinos
There are over 80,000 Filipinos in the Dallas-Fort Worth metroplex. Dallas held its first Filipino food festival in 2020 and there are Filipino grocery stores in the metroplex.

Indians

In 2000, a number slightly over 50% of the Asian Indians in the DFW area lived in Dallas County, and almost 20% lived in Collin County. Most Indians live in suburbs northwest, north, and east of Dallas. Many Indians work for telecommunications companies, Electronic Data Systems (EDS), and Texas Instruments, and Asian Indians tend to live near their workplaces. They also tend to live in public school districts with good reputations.

As of 2000, 40% of the Asian Indians in Dallas County lived in the City of Dallas. The remainder lived in suburban cities. Of the suburbs in the DFW area, Richardson in Dallas County had one of the earliest Indian settlements. As of 2009 the largest Asian ethnic group in Irving is the Asian Indians. As of 2009 the Indians have mainly settled into an area in western Irving along Texas State Highway 114. In order to absorb the Indian population, dense condominium and rental properties have opened in western Irving. This area is in proximity to high technology companies. Mesquite has a group of Indian Americans, mostly Kerala-origin Indian Christians. Their settlement, one of the earliest of the Indian Americans in DFW, was influenced by proximity to Dallas-based hospitals such as Baylor University Medical Center at Dallas and Parkland Hospital.

As of 2000, of the foreign-born residents of Plano, 9% originated from India. The reputation of the Plano Independent School District has attracted many Indian residents.

Recently, there has been a huge influx of Asian Indians in Frisco and Allen. Asian Indians make up the majority of the population in many subdivisions in Frisco. There are also sizable Asian Indian communities in Flower Mound, Murphy and Carrollton.

The India Association of North Texas headquarters are in Richardson.

The Roman Catholic Diocese of Dallas operates the St. Thomas the Apostle Indian Catholic Church, a Syro-Malabar church, in Garland. It also operates the St. Mary Malankara Catholic Church, also in Garland, established in 1993.

Koreans
As of 2014 there were about 86,000 ethnic Koreans in North Texas.

The Korean Society of Dallas serves the Korean community. There is a South Korean consular office in Dallas. The office opened in June 2013 and is the first consul officer is Dong-Chan Kim.

As of 2012 there was a dispute between ethnic Korean business owners and African-Americans in the DFW area. Mayor of Dallas Mike Rawlings attempted to mediate this dispute. American Airlines began nonstop flights from Dallas–Fort Worth International Airport to Incheon Airport near Seoul in May 2013. In January 2014 Shin-Soo Choo was scheduled to visit Dallas.

The Roman Catholic Diocese of Dallas maintains a Korean mission at St. Andrew Kim Church in Dallas, established in 1977.

Pakistanis
There are an estimated 19,000 Pakistanis living in the Dallas-Fort Worth metroplex. Many Pakistanis have immigrated since the 1970s, with the first organization for Pakistani-Americans in DFW dating back to 1984.  Over 60% are college graduates in the US and there are many Pakistani-American physicians, engineers, accountants, computer scientists, engineers, etc. They have been heavily involved in building mosques. There are both Sunni and Shia (including Ismaili) Pakistanis in Dallas-Fort Worth. They are in many cities, including Dallas, Plano, Frisco, Allen, Richardson, Carrollton, Arlington, Irving, Euless, Bedford, etc.

Vietnamese
As of 2014, the DFW area has almost 72,000 people of Vietnamese origins.

As of 2000 12% of the foreign-born population of Garland originated from Vietnam. There are two strip-style shopping malls along Walnut Street that cater to Vietnamese people, and there is also a community center that as of 2009 hosts first generation Vietnamese immigrants. Garland Road serves as a center of the Vietnamese community. During the same year, 14% of the foreign-born population of Arlington originated from Vietnam. Within Arlington most Vietnamese live in the southern portion. That year 4% of the foreign-born of Plano originated in Vietnam. As of 2009 there is also a first-generation Vietnamese population in East Dallas, in the "Little Asia" area. As of 2000 there are fewer Vietnamese in the northern suburbs, which are wealthier compared to other parts of the DFW area.

The first people of Vietnamese origins began arriving in the DFW area in the 1970s. They were refugees from the Vietnam War.

The St. Peter Vietnamese Catholic Church in Dallas opened in 1998. It, as of 2014, has about 1,350 members and 75 families. As of that year, Pham Minh is the pastor. St. Peter opened because the Vietnamese congregation at St. Pius X Church, which began taking in Vietnamese in 1975, had become so large. There are other Vietnamese missions at Mother of Perpetual Help Church in Garland, established in 1992; Sacred Heart of Jesus Church in Carrollton, established in 1998; St. Joseph Vietnamese Catholic Church in Grand Prairie, established in 1995, and the St. Joseph Vietnamese Missionary Center in Dallas.

After the 2014 opening of the Banh Shop, a Vietnamese-style restaurant owned by Yum! Brands, a petition that asked for a change of the restaurant's logo opened. This petition argued that the logo was too similar to the star of the Vietnamese Communist Party. The president of the Vietnamese-American Community of Greater Dallas, Thanh Cung, signed this petition. As a result, the company changed the logo.

Religion

According to a study by the Pew Research Center Dallas is 78% Christian, 1% Jewish, 1% Muslim, and 18% Non Religious.

As of 2000 the Dallas Metropolitan Community Church (MCC), an LGBT-friendly church, has 3,000 members, making it the largest MCC in the United States.

LGBT

The Dallas–Fort Worth area has a robust and diverse LGBT population. The Oak Lawn/Cedar Springs Area has historically had a large LGBT population. Many neighborhoods in Central Dallas have a growing LGBT presence.

See also
Demographics of Dallas
Demographics of Texas
Demographics of Houston
Demographics of San Antonio

References
 Brettell, Caroline B. '"Big D" Incorporating New Immigrants in a Sunbelt Suburban Metropolis' (Chapter 3). In: Singer, Audrey, Susan Wiley Hardwick, and Caroline Brettell. Twenty-First Century Gateways: Immigrant Incorporation in Suburban America (James A. Johnson metro series). Brookings Institution Press, 2009. , 9780815779285. Start p. 53.

Notes

External links
 Kerala Association of Dallas

Dallas-Fort Worth
Dallas–Fort Worth metroplex
Dallas-Fort Worth